Kenneth Stephen Done  (born 29 June 1940) is an Australian artist best known for his design work. Although his simple, brightly coloured images of Australian landmarks have adorned a very popular range of clothing and homewares sold under the "Done Design" brand, Done's primary interest is in being a painter. Art critic John McDonald said: "Anybody who has anything to do with him realises he is a very serious artist."

Early life
Ken Done, an only child, grew up in the northern suburbs of Sydney, New South Wales, and left high school at age 14 to study at the National Art School in East Sydney between 1954 and 1959. At the end of this decade he travelled abroad and began working with the New York and London based advertising agency J. Walter Thompson. He returned to Sydney in 1969 to follow his artistic desires. He became a full-time painter in 1975.

Exhibitions and works

Done's first solo exhibition was in Sydney in 1980. To date he has staged over 100 exhibitions dedicated solely to his work. Done's work has been exhibited in Australia, Japan, and France, amongst others. His first European exhibition was held in Paris in 1996. In the year 2000 his works were exhibited in Los Angeles and in London.

His work for the 1988 World Exposition held in Brisbane Australia, the colourful Children of the World facade for the United Nations Pavilion, and the several 6 m high alphabet letter blocks that adorned the Entrance and Exit of the Australia Pavilion are largely regarded as playing a central role in the celebration and popular culture of Bicentennial Australia and were one of the most photographed works of art at the Expo. They have as part of the 30th Anniversary celebration of Expo 88 in 2018, been fully restored, including an interview with Ken Done.

In 1994 the Powerhouse Museum staged a major retrospective of Done's work.

In 2015 from Dec 11 to Dec 20, 2015, Ken done exhibited a solo show of selected works produced throughout his career titled 'The Joy of Colour' at Trevor Victor Harvey Gallery in Seaforth, making this exhibition his first solo show within a commercial gallery that Ken Done has exhibited outside of his personally owned gallery located in The Rocks, Sydney.

His touring exhibition Paintings you probably haven't seen travelled for almost 3 years touring regional galleries around Australia from 2019. The 35 artworks were hung in 11 galleries, from Far North Queensland to Victoria. They travelled over 10,000 kms, and were hung for 809 days.

Design company

Ken Done created a design company called "Done Art and Design" with his wife Judy Done. The company started out by producing small runs of T-shirts featuring Done's art and the garment design of his wife Judy. In 1993 the company won the Fashion Industries of Australia's, Grand Award.

An original Ken Done work featured on the cover of the Japanese women's magazine Hanako every week between 1989 and 1999.

Advocacy

He has been a UNICEF Australia Goodwill Ambassador since 1988, and won the Australian father of the year award in 1989.

During October 1995, Done was asked to create a series of flag designs by the then Australian Prime Minister Paul Keating. Republicanism in Australia was news at the time and Done submitted sixteen designs to Ausflag, some of which he had created as early as 1981.

He was commissioned to produce a series of works for both the opening and closing ceremonies of the 2000 Sydney Olympic games.

Ken Done has long been a supporter of art in Australia especially encouraging school students through awards and sponsorships, although Done decided to sue Australian band TISM for appropriating his work on an album cover. The album formerly named Australia the Lucky Cunt was released in September 1993 and  depicted a Done-style koala with a syringe in its mouth. Done was angered by this use and obtained an injunction order to ban the sale of the album. The album was then re-released in November under the a new title Censored Due to Legal Advice and a new cover depicting four edited pictures depicting Irish singer Sinéad O'Connor on the TV show Saturday Night Live when she tore up a photo of Pope John Paul II. The images are edited to show the singer tearing up a sheet with TISM's logo and the album's new name on it.

In 2006 he designed and created the United Buddy Bear for Australia.

Expo 88 signs
It was as a result of the commission to design the Entrance and Exit Statement at the Australian Pavilion, at World Expo 88, that he became a UNICEF Goodwill Ambassador in 1988. That Statement became one of the most iconic parts and memories of Expo 88. In effect he donated the signs to a college north of Brisbane. Of recent years the signs have sat rusting away, that was until one college student by the name of Kurt Jones started a social media storm. A local purchased the signs and donated them to the Caboolture Historical Village. After a massive six-month effort by the Historical Village they were unveiled, fully restored by Ken Done AM and Sallyanne Atkinson AO, on 28 October 2018, as the centre piece event in the closing of the 30th Anniversary of Expo 88.

The Ken Done Gallery is located in The Rocks, Sydney.

Distinctions
 : Order of Australia (AM) for services to Art, Design, and Tourism (1992)

Awards
1967 Cannes Gold Lion Award
1973 Gold and Silver A.W.A.R.D.S.
1974 D. & A.D. Awards O.A.A.A. Award
1975 Melbourne A.D.C. Awards
1976 Caxton Award
1977 F.A.C.T.S. Award
1986 New South Wales Tourism Award
1989 Father of the Year
1992 Order of Australia (AM) for services to Art, Design and Tourism
1993 Fashion Industries of Australia Grand Award
1993 Mosman Citizen of the Year
1993 Rotary International Award for Excellence
1993 Spirit of Australia Award for excellence in the Australian Arts

1994 Paul Harris Fellow, Rotary International
1999 Westpac Export Heroes Award, Australian Institute of Export
1999 Fellow of Design Institute of Australia (Hon)
2002 Powerhouse Museum Life Fellow
2002 Bachelor of Design (Hon), Sydney Graphics College
2007 The Japanese Foreign Minister’s Award
2013 Design Institute of Australia Hall of Fame
2016 GQ Iconic Artist
2022 Australian Fashion Laureate Lifetime Achievement Award

Quotes

 If I make a painting, it should be seen for what it's set out to do too. A lot of the things that I do, it's not all art. Some of it's design, some of it's illustration, some of it's graphics, some of it's concept, some of it's business and some of it, hopefully, is art.
 Art shouldn't be something that you go quietly into an art gallery and dip your forelock and say 'I have to be very quiet, I'm in here amongst the art.' It's here, art's everywhere. It's how you use your eyes. It's about the enjoyment of visual things. And it's certainly not for any one group of people.
 I've always thought that there shouldn't be any limit to the things that are well designed. And I think that people who consider that art should only be kept for art galleries and doesn't have a role in public life, I think that's too narrow.
 In the times in which we live it is far too restricting to say that art can only be found in art galleries and not touch people's everyday lives.. I want to use any means that are necessary to communicate to people what I feel about things. There are no rules. And if there are rules, then you may as well break them.
 Wherever you are in the world, there's always something about the Australian light. There's something about the sharpness of it, something about the clarity of it, something about the colours of Australia. And, hopefully, something optimistic about Australian painting too.

References

External links
 Ken Done website

1940 births
Living people
Australian painters
Clothing brands
Members of the Order of Australia
National Art School alumni